Bhimavaram is a city and headquarters of West Godavari district of the Andhra Pradesh state of India. It is the administrative headquarters of Bhimavaram mandal in Bhimavaram revenue division. It is a part of Bhimavaram Urban Development Authority.  census, it is the most populous urban area in the district with a population of 210,000. It is one of the major pilgrimage centers in the state, which is home to Somaramam, one of the five great Pancharama Kshetras.

History 

Along with much of present-day coastal Andhra Pradesh, Bhimavaram was controlled by the Chola dynasty. Under Kulothunga Chola I, Bhimavaram was ruled by his sons who served as viceroys. Stone inscriptions have been found in the town dating from his reign (c. 1096 C.E.).

Etymology 

The name Bhimavaram literally means "the gift of Bhima". According to a legend, in around 890–918 AD, an Eastern Chalukya king named Chalukya Bheema built a Siva temple and laid the foundation to this town. It was originally called "Bhimapuram", but the name gradually changed to "Bhimavaram"; "puram" refers to a dwelling place while "varam" means an endowment in Telugu.

Demographics 

 census of India, the town had a population of 142,184. The total population constitutes 70,066 males and 72,214 females—a sex ratio of 1031 females per 1000 males. 12,157 children are in the age group of 0–6 years, of which 6,149 are boys and 6,008 are girls—a ratio of 977 girls per 1000 boys. The average literacy rate stands at 83.41% with 1,08,535 literates, significantly higher than the state average of 73.00%. Its urban agglomeration population was 146,961.

Economy 

Bhimavaram is in the epicentre of the Godavari delta region. It is one of the principal trade centres of paddy in the state of Andhra Pradesh. Agriculture-based businesses like food processing, aqua culture, rice mills etc., are the chief sources of the town's revenue. It serves as a distribution centre as well as commercial centre to its hinterland. The town is the regional centre for higher education and is known for its specialized health services. It has many major retail brand shops like KLM, DMart, Coastal city centre etc..,

Governance

Civic administration
Its urban agglomeration covers Bhimavaram Municipal Corporation, partly out growths of Rayalam (rural) and Chinamiram.

Trace of Bhimavaram Municipality Evolution:

 April 1948: Bhimavaram Municipal Corporation was established as a third grade Municipal Corporation.
 August 1963: Upgraded to a second grade municipality in August 1963.
 August 1967: Upgraded to a first grade municipality in August 1967.
 September 1980: Upgraded to a Special Grade Municipality in September 1980.
 September 2011: It was upgraded to 'Selection Grade municipality' in 2011.
 1 January 2019: Bhimavaram Urban Development Authority created. Bhimavaram became a part of EUDA along with places in West Godavari District.

Politics

Bhimavaram assembly constituency is a legislative assembly constituency in Andhra Pradesh. Grandhi Srinivas is the current MLA.

Transport 

It is well connected with other places in the country by national highways. NH 216 passes through the town.

The Andhra Pradesh State Road Transport Corporation operates bus services from Bhimavaram bus station. Bhimavaram Junction railway station is classified as 'NSG-4' in South Central Railway zone. The Gudivada–Bhimavaram section connects it with Howrah-Chennai main line.

Bhimavaram Town  railway station   is well-connected with daily trains to major cities like Hyderabad, Vizag, Tirupathi, Mumbai, Chennai and Bangalore. Almost all the trains passing through the Junction pass through the town station and vice versa.

There are as many as 2,69,137 vehicle owners are licensed according to transport officials in the town. Out of this, about 13,064 are autos, 1236 school buses, 9908 lorries, 11,129 cars, 2,04,728 motorbikes, 2,833 three-wheelers, 15 car travels, and 5 bus travel vehicles.

The nearest airport to Bhimavaram is Rajahmundry Airport, which is 80 km away. Bhimavaram is located at distance of 120km from Vijayawada - Wikipedia, 265 km from Visakhapatnam - Wikipedia and 400 km from Hyderabad - Wikipedia

Culture 
Bhimavaram is famous for the Gunupudi Someswara (Somarama) temple, which is one of the five holy Pancharamas and the temple of the local deity Mavullamma. The Shiva lingam is known for changing its color according to the lunar month: Black during amavasya and white during pournami.

The local deity Mavullamma is believed to have manifested here in the year 1200 CE with the temple being built around 1880 CE. According to local folklore the goddess manifested between a mango farm earning her the name Mamillamma (arising from mangoes) which was later adapted to Mavullamma.

Many people from the city have become notable in the Telugu cinema industry such as, Trivikram Srinivas, Sivaji Raja, Penmatsa Subbaraju, Sunil, Prabhas and Raja Ravindra.

Other notable personalities include Krishnam Raju Gadiraju, K. V. K. Raju, Yellapragada Subbarao in science, mystic Swami Jnanananda, Industrialists B. V. Raju, Byrraju Ramalinga Raju and freedom fighter Alluri Sitarama Raju.

Education 
Primary and secondary school education is imparted by government, aided, and private schools of the School Education Department of the state. The mediums of instruction followed by schools are English and Telugu.

There are numerous higher educational institutions in and around Bhimavaram. Some of the renowned institutions are S.R.K.R Engineering College, D.N.R Educational Institutions, K.G.R.L Group of Educational Institutions, Sri Vishnu Educational Society, Bhimavaram Institute of Engineering & Technology, Grandhi Varalakshmi Venkatarao Institute of Technology (GVIT), Dr. C.S.N. degree and P.G college.

Other schools
Sarada Residential School

See also 
 List of cities in Andhra Pradesh
 List of municipalities in Andhra Pradesh
 Kolleru Lake
 Kolleru Bird Sanctuary

References

External links 

 Bhimavaram Municipality website

 
Cities in Andhra Pradesh
Mandal headquarters in West Godavari district